"P.S.K. What Does It Mean?" (also written as "P.S.K. (What Does It Mean?)") is a song released in 1985 by Philadelphia rapper Schoolly D on his independent label Schoolly D Records. P.S.K. is the abbreviation for Park Side Killas, a street gang with which Schoolly D was affiliated. The highly influential song is considered the first gangsta rap and hardcore rap song and features incidents of graphic sex, gunplay, drug references, along with one of the first uses of the word "nigga" in a rap song (earlier uses include "Scoopy Rap" and "Family Rap" in 1979 and "New York New York" in 1983).

It would be critical to the rise of West Coast gangsta rap when the street hustler, gang member and upcoming rapper by the name of Ice-T released his hardcore anthem "6 in the Mornin'" that he has said in interviews was written after he heard Schoolly D's "P.S.K." Eazy-E's first song "Boyz-N-The-Hood" is also heavily influenced by "P.S.K." Another fan of the song is musician Moby and Danny Diablo, who covered it with the Lordz of Brooklyn.

The influential beat was performed by a Roland TR-909 drum machine. It would later be the basis of Siouxsie and the Banshees' song "Kiss Them for Me" and Strike's "I Have Peace" while "Pearl" by Chapterhouse and a remix of "Ain't Nobody Stupid", written by Ne-Yo, amongst other acts also used it. American rapper The Notorious B.I.G. included it on "B.I.G. Interlude", as does DJ Khaled for the song "It Ain't Over 'Til It's Over" featuring Mary J. Blige, Fabolous and Jadakiss from Khaled's 2011 studio album We the Best Forever. Eminem also samples it on his song "So Far..." from The Marshall Mathers LP 2. This song has been sampled by The Prodigy on three occasions. It was first used on the song "Rock 'N' Roll", which later became "You'll Be Under My Wheels". They used it a second time in the song "Diesel Power". They used it a third time on the album The Day Is My Enemy.

References

1985 singles
Gangsta rap songs